The Marvel Cinematic Universe (MCU) is an American media franchise and shared universe centered on a series of superhero films, independently produced by Marvel Studios and based on characters that appear in American comic books published by Marvel Comics. The franchise also includes comic books, short films, television series, and digital series. The shared universe, much like the original Marvel Universe in comic books, was established by crossing over common plot elements, settings, cast, and characters.

The franchise has been nominated for 14 Critics' Choice Super Awards (winning four), among others.

Critics' Choice Super Awards

Critics' Choice Television Awards

MTV Movie & TV Awards

Primetime Creative Arts Emmy Awards

Saturn Awards

Visual Effects Society

References

External links 

 
 
 
 
 
 
 
 
 
 
 
 
 
 
 
 
 

Accolades television series
Marvel Cinematic Universe television series